Kaj Kvistgård Poulsen, known as Kaj Poulsen, (born 31 December 1942) is a Danish former association footballer in the striker position, who played 141 games and scored 29 goals for Vejle Boldklub. He played five matches for the Denmark national football team, and scored one goal against Wales in a qualification game for the 1966 FIFA World Cup. He was named 1965 Danish Football Player of the Year. Poulsen moved abroad to play professionally with German Bundesliga club Hannover 96 in 1966. He also played for Belgian clubs K. Beerschot V.A.C. and KFC Turnhout, before ending his career with Vejle in 1974.

References

External links
Danish national team profile 

1942 births
Living people
Danish men's footballers
Denmark international footballers
Denmark under-21 international footballers
Vejle Boldklub players
Hannover 96 players
K. Beerschot V.A.C. players
Bundesliga players
Association football forwards